Christopher John Holland-Martin (16 November 1910 – 5 April 1960) was a British banker and Conservative Party politician.

Early career
The son of the Chairman of Martins Bank, Holland-Martin was educated at Eton and Balliol College, Oxford. He followed his father's profession but in 1939 was commissioned in the Royal Fusiliers (Territorial Army). Invalided out of the Army, Holland-Martin was appointed Military Secretary to the Governor-General of New Zealand, Cyril Newall from 1942 to 1944. He briefly held the same post in relation to the Governor of Kenya in 1945.

Post-war
After the war, Holland-Martin was appointed a Director of Martins Bank. He also became involved in politics and was made Joint Honorary Treasurer of the Conservative Party from 1947; two years later he married Lady Anne Cavendish MBE, daughter of the Duke of Devonshire.

Parliament
At the 1951 general election, Holland-Martin was elected as Conservative Member of Parliament for Ludlow. His experience in financial matters was often in evidence in House of Commons debates, although he was generally low profile. He remained involved in business throughout his time in Parliament.

Disqualification question
In 1955 he was caught up in a minor constitutional crisis over his local Directorship of the Bank of New Zealand. With the Bank's shares vested in the Crown, the Directorship was technically an 'office of profit under the crown' and as such a disqualification from the House of Commons. Holland-Martin immediately resigned his office while the law was changed and an Act of Parliament was passed to indemnify him from the consequences of having acted as a Member of Parliament while disqualified.

Death
Later in the 1950s Holland-Martin became involved in many African-related mining and exploration companies. While on a visit to Southern Rhodesia in January 1960, he suffered a heart attack and was confined to bed at Government House; he was returned to Britain but died at his home in Colwall, Herefordshire in April, aged 49.

References

M. Stenton and S. Lees, "Who's Who of British MPs" Vol. IV (Harvester Press, 1981)
Obituary, The Times, 6 April 1960.
Genealogy of Robert Martin (1908–1987) a genealogy of the family as in Burke's Peerage. Retrieved 10 August 2007.  Christopher Holland-Martin MP was the sixth but fifth surviving son of Robert Martin Holland, later Holland-Martin (R Licence 14 August 1917), and younger brother of Admiral Sir Deric Holland-Martin, who was married to Rosamund Holland-Martin.

External links 
 

1910 births
1960 deaths
Alumni of Balliol College, Oxford
Conservative Party (UK) MPs for English constituencies
Royal Fusiliers officers
People educated at Eton College
UK MPs 1951–1955
UK MPs 1955–1959
UK MPs 1959–1964
People educated at West Downs School
Members of the Parliament of the United Kingdom for constituencies in Shropshire